Abibatu Mogaji  (16 October 1916 – 15 June 2013) was a Nigerian business magnate and the Ìyál'ọ́jà of Lagos. She was the mother of the president-elect of Nigeria Bola Tinubu.

Early life
Abibatu Mogaji was born on 16 October 1916, in Lagos, Southern Nigeria.

Family
Chief Mogaji was the mother of the national leader of the All Progressives Congress and ex-governor of Lagos State, Chief Bola Tinubu. Chief Tinubu's daughter, Folashade, would go on to succeed her grandmother as Ìyál'ọ́jà of Nigeria.

Career
Prior to her appointment as the Iyaloja of the Association of Nigerian Market Women and Men, Chief Mogaji was the vocal leader of the market women's association in Lagos State. In this capacity, she served as the successor of the powerful Alimotu Pelewura.

In recognition of her contributions to trading in Nigeria, Chief Mogaji was bestowed with National awards by the Federal Government of Nigeria.
She also received several honorary doctorate degrees from recognized Nigerian Universities, such as Ahmadu Bello University and the University of Lagos.

Death
Chief Mogaji died on Saturday, 15 June 2013 at the age of 96 in her home at Ikeja, the capital of Lagos State. She was later buried at Ikoyi Vaults and Gardens in Lagos State.

Awards
Order of the Federal Republic
Order of the Niger

References

2013 deaths
1916 births
Businesspeople from Lagos State
Nigerian Muslims
Yoruba women in business
20th-century Nigerian businesswomen
20th-century Nigerian businesspeople
Burials at the Vaults and Gardens, Ikoyi
Tinubu family